Monark is a 2021 Japanese role-playing game developed by Lancarse for the PlayStation 4, PlayStation 5 and Nintendo Switch. It was localized and ported to Microsoft Windows by NIS America in February 2022.

Gameplay
Monark is a tactical role-playing game with combat similar to Lost Dimension. Gameplay is split between the character evolving their own desires by exploring the school campus, and fighting monsters called "daemons" in the Otherworld.

Story
Monark takes place inside Shin Mikado Academy, a high school sealed from the outside world by a barrier and enveloped in a mysterious mist that drives the students mad. The player is part of a group of students who gained the ability to enter an Otherworld, where the demons empowering the mist must be defeated.

Development
The game is developed by Lancarse and published by FuRyu. Some members of the staff from the Shin Megami Tensei series were involved in the game's development. Fuyuki Hayashi wrote the scenario and dialogue for all of the major characters, while Ryutaro Ito wrote for the NPC characters. Kazunari Suzuki provided supervision and feedback on all parts of the scenario.

Reception

Monark received "mixed or average" reviews, according to review aggregator Metacritic.

IGN lauded the game's personalness, combat systems, and abilities, and cited the unengaging story, characters, party member system, enemies, repetition, and puzzles as its drawbacks. Destructoid severely criticized the game's repetitive nature and concluded, "There are some novel ideas here, and if you’re looking for something outside the RPG status quo and with a darker vibe, Monark could fit the bill. Just go in knowing that it can get arduous, and you’ll need to overlook those faults to find what Monark does that’s really different." Nintendo Life gave the game seven stars out of ten and praised the high-risk, high-reward combat system, creepy aesthetics, interesting story, and replay value, while criticizing the lackluster graphics, repetitive environments, and lack of enemy variety. Push Square reviewed the game much more negatively, giving it four stars out of ten, and cited the use of the horror genre, boss designs, and music, as positives, while calling the repetitive, grindy combat the game's biggest downfall. RPGFan liked the vocal tracks, opening cinematic, characters, themes and combat, and said that the game's bad pacing, subpar graphics and the transphobic treatment of the character of Perrine held it back. Nintendo World Report thought that the story was interesting and that the stat progression system was unique but disliked the lack of environments, character-locking progression system, and puzzle design.

Sales

The Nintendo Switch version of Monark was the sixth bestselling game during its first week of release in Japan, with 10,521 physical copies being sold. The PlayStation 4 version was the seventeenth bestselling game in the country throughout the same week, with 5,242 physical copies being sold.

Notes

References

External links
 

2021 video games
Nippon Ichi Software games
PlayStation 4 games
PlayStation 5 games
Nintendo Switch games
Role-playing video games
Tactical role-playing video games
Video games developed in Japan
High school-themed video games
Windows games
FuRyu games
Single-player video games